Lichenopteryx despecta, the despised monkey, is a moth in the family Eupterotidae. It was described by father and son entomologists Cajetan and Rudolf Felder in 1874. It is found in KwaZulu-Natal in South Africa and Zanzibar in Tanzania.

References

Moths described in 1874
Eupterotinae